Daniel Lewis Guda (born 22 June 1996) is an Australian male badminton player. In 2013, the Manila, Philippines born, Guda won the boys' singles title at the Oceania Junior Championships. In 2014, he competed at the Nanjing Summer Youth Olympics. In the senior event, he won the 2015 Oceania Championships in the men's singles event after beating Luke Charlesworth of New Zealand.

Achievements

Oceania Championships
Men's Singles

Oceania Junior Championships 
Boys' Singles

Mixed Doubles

References

External links 
 
 

Living people
1996 births
Sportspeople from Manila
Australian people of Filipino descent
Australian male badminton players
Badminton players at the 2014 Summer Youth Olympics